The following people have coached the Australia national rugby league team. the first official coach was Albert Johnston and the current coach is Mal Meninga. The official Australia team has had 26 coaches, while John Lang was the only coach of the Super League team that played in 1997.

List of coaches

Super League

References

External links 

 Rugby League Project

Australia national rugby league team
Australia national rugby league team coaches
Australia